Gertrude Warner (April 2, 1917 – January 26, 1986) was an American voice talent who played multiple characters on radio productions during the Golden Age of Radio.

Early life
Warner was born in Hartford, Connecticut, in 1917. Her father was James L. Warner, who died not long after the great crash of 1929. Her mother was Mildred Lovejoy Warner, who died in 1976. Her brother, James L. Warner, was a B17 pilot in World War II, who died on November 20, 2008. She is survived by her son, Douglas Warner Frank.

Career
Warner's first starring role on radio came when she was 23, playing Rebecca Lane in Beyond These Valleys on CBS. Her successful radio career continued for 28 years and well over 4,000 performances. She was considered one of the queens of daytime radio, appearing in dozens of daytime serials. Among her accomplishments was being the female lead on the dramatic anthology Brownstone Theater on Mutual.

She portrayed such well known characters as Della Street on the daytime The New Adventures of Perry Mason, "the lovely Margot Lane" on The Shadow, and the title character on Joyce Jordan, M.D. The Lux Radio Theater episode of Mrs. Miniver proved so popular, it was developed into a daytime serial with Warner in the title role and as narrator.

Trudy Warner played leading, supporting and some times guest roles on popular radio series, such as Young Doctor Malone, The Mystery Man, Dimension X, Nick Carter, Master Detective, Dangerously Yours, Suspense, Cavalcade of America, Matinee Theater, The MGM Theater of the Air and dozens more programs. She was the third-busiest actor in the Golden Age of Radio.

Later in her life, she taught acting for television at Oberlin College and Weist Barron studios.

Personal life
Warner was married to Carl Frank from 1955 until 1957. Together they have a son, Douglas Warner Frank. She also has two grandchildren, Griffin and Caroline Frank.

Death
Gertrude Warner died on January 26, 1986, from cancer.

References

External links
 ♬ Last Ride on the Merry Go Round - Theater Five, March 8, 1965, Starring Gertrude Warner, Hosted by Archive.org
Gertrude Warner at  Radio Gold Index 
Busiest actors in radio - Gertrude Warner (#3) at Metro Washington Old Time Radio Club
"The Definitive Dangerously Yours Radio Log" with Biography of Gertrude Warner

1917 births
1986 deaths
American radio actresses
American soap opera actresses
Deaths from cancer in New York (state)
20th-century American actresses
Actresses from Hartford, Connecticut